Raymond of Toulouse, also known as Raymond Gayrard, was a chanter and canon renowned for generosity. A native of Toulouse, who entered religious life after the death of his wife. He became a canon of St. Sernin, Toulouse, helping to rebuild the church which became a popular place for pilgrims.

After his death on 3 July 1118, many miracles were reported at his tomb and he was beatified in 1652 by Pope Innocent X.

See also
 Musée Saint-Raymond

Notes

French Roman Catholic saints
12th-century Christian saints
1118 deaths
Year of birth unknown